AICS may refer to:

 Academy of Integrated Christian Studies,  Aizawl, Mizoram, India
 Accuracy International Chassis System, a component of the Accuracy International Arctic Warfare rifle
 Amsterdam International Community School, a school in south Amsterdam, The Netherlands
 Asian Institute of Computer Studies, a private higher educational institution in the Philippines
 Asmara International Community School, an international school in Asmara, Eritrea
 Agenzia italiana per la cooperazione allo sviluppo, the Italian Agency for Development Cooperation.

See also
AIC (disambiguation)